The Laing Ladies Charity Classic was a women's professional golf tournament on the Ladies European Tour held in England. It was first played in 1985 and held annually until 1990.

Winners

Source:

References

External links
Ladies European Tour

Former Ladies European Tour events
Golf tournaments in England
Defunct sports competitions in England
Recurring sporting events established in 1985
Recurring sporting events disestablished in 1990